Fifty is a 2015 Nigerian romantic drama film, directed by Biyi Bandele and released on 18 December 2015.

Plot
Fifty captures few pivotal days of four women at the pinnacle of their careers. Tola, Elizabeth, Maria and Kate are four friends forced at midlife to take inventory at their personal lives, while juggling career and family against the backdrops of the neighbourhoods of Lagos.

Tola is a reality TV star whose marriage to lawyer Kunle never stood a chance thanks to an invidious family secret. Elizabeth is a celebrated obstetrician whose penchant for younger men has estranged her from her daughter. Maria, a forty nine-year old has an affair with a married man that results in an unexpected pregnancy and Kate's battle with a life-threatening illness has plugged her into religious obsession.

Cast

Main cast
 Ireti Doyle as Elizabeth who is an obstetrician whose desire for younger men has caused a strain on her relationship with her daughter.
 Dakore Akande as Tola who is a reality TV star whose marriage to lawyer Kunle never stood a chance due to an invidious family secret.
 Omoni Oboli as Maria who is a forty-nine year old lady who had an affair with a married man that results in an unexpected pregnancy
 Nse Ikpe-Etim as Kate who is battling with a life-threatening illness that plunged her into religious obsession
 Wale Ojo as Kunle
 Kachi Nnochiri as Chike
 Emmanuel Ikubese as Sammy
 Kemi ‘Lala’ Akindoju as Chi Chi
 Timini Egbuson as Jamal
 Uzor Osimkpa as Sade

Guest stars
 King Sunny Adé as himself
 Femi Kuti as himself
 Nneka as herself
 Tiwa Savage as herself
 Waje as herself

Production
The film is executively produced by Ebony Life TV CEO Mo Abudu. Directed by Biyi Bandele.

Release
Fifty had its premiere in London in October 2015, which sold out in four days, and a private screening in Lagos was also held that month. The Grand Premiere was on Sunday, 13 December 2015, at the Eko Hotel and Suites. 
The film was released to cinemas on 18 December 2015.

Critical reception
The movie was met with mixed to positive reviews. Nollywood Reinvented rated the movie 52% and highlighted its lack of content and depth.

References

External links
 
 
 "EN: Exclusive Interview With Director Biyi Bandele, Cast & Crew Of Movie 'Fifty' 19/12/15", Channels Television, 19 December 2015.

2010s English-language films
2015 romantic drama films
English-language Nigerian films
Films directed by Biyi Bandele
Films set in Lagos
Films shot in Lagos
Nigerian romantic drama films